White Deer Park is the second and final studio album by Australian rock band Papa vs Pretty, and the follow up to their 2011 ARIA-nominated debut album United in Isolation. It was released on 21 February 2014 through Peace & Riot.

The album was recorded at Studios 301 and Forgotten Valley Studios in Sydney, Australia, and at Kingsize Soundlabs in Silver Lake, Los Angeles, California, throughout March and April 2013. Over 80 new songs were written for the album between 2011 and early 2013, prior to the band entering the studio. The album was produced by Grammy-nominated producer Dave Trumfio.

The album's first single, "My Life Is Yours", was released 13 September 2013, followed by the second single, "Smother", which was released 6 December 2013.

Track listing

Charts

Personnel
 Thomas Rawle – lead vocals, guitar, keyboards
 Luke Liang – guitar, keyboards, vocals
 Angus Gardiner – bass, vocals, keyboards, violoncello
 Tom Myers – drums, vocals

Additional personnel
 Dave Trumfio – producer

References

External links 
Papa vs Pretty official website

Papa vs Pretty albums
2014 albums